The 1945 St. Louis Cardinals season was the team's 64th season in St. Louis, Missouri and the 54th season in the National League. The Cardinals went 95–59 during the season and finished 2nd in the National League. The Cardinals set a Major League record which still stands, for the fewest double plays grounded into during a season, with only 75.

Offseason
 Prior to 1945 season: Steve Bilko was signed by the Cardinals as an amateur free agent.

Regular season 
An almost incredible place in baseball history was at stake. Billy Southworth and his Cardinals had a chance to become only the second ball club after the 1921-24 Giants to win four consecutive NL pennants.

However, the war finally drained the Redbirds of the talent needed to win a championship. 

Stan Musial, Walker Cooper, Max Lanier and pitcher Mort Cooper, who experienced elbow problems later in the season, got into a contract squabble with Harry Breadon during the spring. They signed contracts for $12,000 apiece, then balked at reporting for opening day after learning Marion had been upped to $15,000.

On May 23, the Cards sent Mort Cooper to the Boston Braves for pitcher Red Barrett, who compiled a league-high total of 23 wins, and $60,000. However, the Redbirds did not have enough pitching depth to keep up with the faster pace of a Chicago Cubs team filled with veteran pitchers such as Paul Derringer.

The Cardinals actually won 16 of their 22 meetings with The Cubs.

Only Whitey Kurowski batted over .300 among the regulars. He was one of the few Cardinals were able to keep their jobs once the boys marched home from Europe and the Pacific.

Red Schoendienst stole 26 bases but batted just .278 and drove in only 47 runs.

Season standings

Record vs. opponents

Notable transactions 
 May 8, 1945: Glenn Crawford and John Antonelli were traded by the Cardinals to the Philadelphia Phillies for Buster Adams.

Roster

Player stats

Batting

Starters by position 
Note: Pos = Position; G = Games played; AB = At bats; H = Hits; Avg. = Batting average; HR = Home runs; RBI = Runs batted in

Other batters 
Note: G = Games played; AB = At bats; H = Hits; Avg. = Batting average; HR = Home runs; RBI = Runs batted in

Pitching

Starting pitchers 
Note: G = Games pitched; IP = Innings pitched; W = Wins; L = Losses; ERA = Earned run average; SO = Strikeouts

Other pitchers 
Note: G = Games pitched; IP = Innings pitched; W = Wins; L = Losses; ERA = Earned run average; SO = Strikeouts

Relief pitchers 
Note: G = Games pitched; W = Wins; L = Losses; SV = Saves; ERA = Earned run average; SO = Strikeouts

Farm system

External links 
1945 St. Louis Cardinals at Baseball Reference
1945 St. Louis Cardinals team page at www.baseball-almanac.com

Notes

References 

St. Louis Cardinals seasons
Saint Louis Cardinals season
St. Louis